The South Africa cricket team toured Australia from 2 to 23 November 2014. The tour consisted of three Twenty20 Internationals (T20I) and five One Day International (ODI) matches. During the ODI series, the International Cricket Council undertook a trial to broadcast the discussions between the on-field and television umpires. Australian captain Michael Clarke injured his hamstring during the first ODI game and was ruled out for the rest of the series. George Bailey captained the side for the remaining fixtures.

Australia won the T20I series 2–1 and the ODI series 4–1. With their win in the final ODI match, Australia went to number one in the ODI rankings.

Squads

Tour match

Twenty20: Cricket Australia XI v South Africans

T20I series

1st T20I

2nd T20I

3rd T20I

ODI series

1st ODI

2nd ODI

3rd ODI

4th ODI

5th ODI

References

External links
 Series home at ESPN Cricinfo

2014 in Australian cricket
2014 in South African cricket
2014-15
International cricket competitions in 2014–15
2014–15 Australian cricket season